Pseudiron is a genus of crabwalker mayflies in the family Pseudironidae. There is one described species in Pseudiron, P. centralis.

References

Further reading

 
 

Mayflies
Articles created by Qbugbot